Estephan Al-Douaihi ( / ALA-LC: Isṭifānūs al-thānī Buṭrus al-Duwayhī; ; ; ; August 2, 1630 – May 3, 1704) was the 57th Patriarch of the Maronite Church, serving from 1670 until his death. He was born in Ehden, Lebanon. He is considered one of the major Lebanese historians of the 17th century and was known as “The Father of Maronite History”, “Pillar of the Maronite Church”, “The Second Chrysostom”, “Splendor of the Maronite Nation”, “The Glory of Lebanon and the Maronites”. He was declared Servant of God by the Congregation for the Causes of Saints under Protocol number 2145. On July 3, 2008, Pope Benedict XVI authorised the Congregation for the Causes of Saints to draw up a decree on the heroic virtues of Patriarch al-Duwayhi, who will be referred to as Venerable from the moment of publication of the decree. This is an important step in the ongoing beatification process.

Biography

Early life
El Douaihy was born to a noble family (El Douaihy). At the age of sixteen, recognized as a brilliant young talent, he was sent to the Maronite College (Seminary) in Rome. He studied there for fourteen years, from 1641 to 1655, being cured of a serious condition that almost led to blindness. El Douaihy believed that the intercession of the Blessed Virgin Mary was responsible for his cure. While in Italy, he traveled as widely as possible seeking manuscripts dealing with Maronite history and liturgy. When he returned to Lebanon at the age of 25, he continued his research.

On March 25, 1656, he was ordained priest by Patriarch Safrawy. In 1658, he was sent to serve the Maronite parish in Aleppo. He was appointed apostolic visitor in countryside Lebanon, and later he served in the parish of Ardeh. In 1662, he was again sent to Aleppo, where he remained until May 21, 1668. On his return, he went on a pilgrimage to the Holy Land. On July 8, 1668, he was appointed and consecrated bishop of the Maronite Diocese of Cyprus by Patriarch George Beseb'ely. He travelled to Cyprus for a pastoral visit in 1669.

Expanded description
As bishop, and later as Patriarch, he undertook reforms of the Maronite Church and its monks. El Douaihy was elected Patriarch on May 20, 1670, when he was only 40 years old, but was confirmed by Rome only on August 8, 1672. This is universally seen as an acknowledgment of his personal moral qualities, his extraordinary learning, and his keen appreciation of the issues the Maronites faced. He paid particular attention to the traditions of the Maronite Church, and favoured a de-Latinisation of rites and ceremonies. He was hounded – there is no better word – by Ottoman authorities, who resented his principled appeals for justice for the Maronites. In particular, they were frustrated by his resistance to their oppressive taxation policies: policies which saw the abandonment of many villages by peasants unable to pay their taxes. It was also a period when Maronites and, in particular, their clergy, were liable to sudden arrest, assault and murder. The Patriarch was not exempt, being assaulted himself. He was accordingly obliged to move from place to place. Yet, he maintained his writing, and without him, we would be very much poorer in our knowledge of Maronite matters.

El Douaihy traveled throughout the Maronite world, including Cyprus and Aleppo, which were even more important centers of the Maronite faith then, although they are still important now. This is partly because Aleppo was at that time a focus for the international overland trade, the only trade where the Ottoman Empire had any opening, given the European domination of the sea routes.

Death and afterward
Almost immediately after his death, on May 3, 1704 in Qannubine, Kadisha Valley, he was considered by many Maronites of Lebanon, but particularly in North Lebanon and in Zgharta, Ehden to have been a saint. The Congregation of the Causes of Saints issued the decree of nulla osta for his beatification cause on December 5, 1996. The Patriarchate of Antioch of the Maronites proceeded with the diocesan investigation and, at its culmination, submitted the results to congregation, which validated the proceedings with a decree dated on November 8, 2002. The Positio for the beatification cause was published in 2005 and it received the approval of the Historical Commission of the Congregation of the Causes of Saints on January 24, 2006. On July 3, 2008, Pope Benedict XVI authorised the Congregation for the Causes of Saints to draw up a decree on the heroic virtues of Patriarch al-Duwayhi who will be referred to as Venerable from the moment of publication of the decree. Some of the miracles attributed to him have been collected by M.S. El Douaihy.

A miracle attributed to his intercession was investigated and was subject to a diocesan investigation; the miracle received formal ratification from the Congregation for the Causes of Saints on 30 January 2014. Papal approval of the miracle is required for his beatification.

Religious, philosophical and/or political views
Al-Duwayhi strongly believed in the social importance of education and science (being an amateur scientist himself). Given the importance of learning, and his experience in how far European education exceeded Oriental, he pursued a successful policy of sending as many Maronites to Rome as possible, to become capable of returning to the villages in which the Maronite peasantry lived, and raising the level of general education. Al-Duwayhi established a college in Aleppo, which became the base for the development of renewed monastic orders. As with his educational policy, his monastic renewal was a success, and still bears fruit today.

Works
Of the many works of Patriarch al-Duwayhi, the vast bulk are still available only in Arabic. A selection has been translated into French by Youakim Moubarac in Pentalogie antiochenne/domaine Maronite. That selection focusses upon his discussion of the rites and ceremonies of the Maronite Church. However, his major work is a general history book, Tarikh Al Azminah, available in several versions.

Published works
Duwayhī, I., & Fahd, B. (1976). Tārīkh al-azminah. Dar Lahd Khatir, Lebanon. 
Duwayhī, I., & Tawtal, F. (1951). Tārīkh al-azminah, 1095–1699. Bayrūt: al-Matbaaah al-Kāthūlīkīyah. 
Duwayhī, I., & Hage, L. (1987). The Syriac model strophes and their poetic meters, by the Maronite Patriarch Stephen Douayhi an introduction, translation, commentary and critical edition. Kaslik, Lebanon: University of the Holy Spirit. 
Duwayhī, I., & Shartūnī, R. a.-K. (1980). Manārat al-aqdās. Rābitat al-Batrīark Istīfān al-Duwayhī al-Thaqāfīyah, Zgharta, Lebanon. 
Duwayhī, I., & Fahd, B. (1974). Kitāb al-sharh al-mukhtassar fī asl al-Mawārinah wa-thabātihim fī al-amānah wa-ṣiyānatihim min kull bidaah wa-kihānah. [Bayrūt]: Butrus Fahd. 
Duwayhī, I., & Daww, A. (1973). Asl al-Mawārinah. Manshūrāt Muaassasat al-Turāth al-Ihdinī, 1. Ihdan, Lebanon: [Muaassasat al-Turāth al-Ihdinī]. 
Duwayhī, I., & Hage, L. (1986). Les strophes-types syriaques et leurs mètres poétiques du patriarche maronite Etienne Douayhi. Bibliothèque de l'Université Saint-Esprit, 13. Kaslik, Liban: Bibliothèque de l'Université Saint-Esprit. 
Duwayhī, I., & Shartūnī, R. a.-K. (1890). Tārīkh al-tāifah al-Mārūnīyah. Bayrūt: al-Matbaah al-Kāthūlīkīyah. 
Duwayhī, I., & Fahd, B. (1974). Liber brevis explicationis de Maronitarum origine eorumque perpetua orthodoxia et salute ab omni haeresi et superstitione. S.l: s.n.].

See also

List of Maronite Patriarchs
Maronite Church

References

Further reading
Jumayyil, N., & Duwayhī, I. (1991). al-Batrīyark Istifānūs al-Duwayhī hayātuhu wa-muaallafātuhu. Bayrūt: N. al-Jumayyil. 
Shiblī, B. (1970). Tarjamat abīnā al-maghbūt Istifānūs Butrus al-Duwayhī batriyark Antākyah, 1630–1704. Jūniyah, Lubnān: [al-Hikmah]. 
Hārūn, J. (1981). Istifān al-Duwayhī. Beirut: s.n.]. 
Nūjaym, T. F. (1990). La maronité chez Estéfān Dūwayhī. Kaslik, Liban: Université Saint-Esprit. 
Maroun, S.-G. (1988). Stephan Ad-Doueihy a Maronite splendor. Washington, D.C.

External links
The official site of El Douaihy Clan
Patriarch Estephan Douaihy Website
catholic-hierarchy.org
ddata.over-blog.com
Patriarch Estephan Douaihy on Ehden Family Tree Website 

17th-century Maronite Catholic bishops
18th-century people from the Ottoman Empire
1630 births
1704 deaths
Maronites from the Ottoman Empire
Christian writers
17th-century writers from the Ottoman Empire
Maronite Patriarchs of Antioch
Venerated Catholics by Pope Benedict XVI
18th-century venerated Christians
17th-century Eastern Catholic archbishops
People from Zgharta
18th-century Eastern Catholic archbishops
17th-century Arabic writers